Vistabella del Maestrat in Valencian or Vistabella del Maestrazgo in Spanish is a municipality in the comarca of Alt Maestrat, Castellon, Valencia, Spain. It is bordered by the municipalities of Vilafranca, Benassal, Culla, Benafigos, Atzeneta del Maestrat, Xodos, y Villahermosa in the province of Castellon; and Mosqueruela y Puertomingalvo in the province of Teruel.
It is located in "El macizo de Penyagolosa" and it is the highest municipality in the Valencian Community with 1,249 m of altitude.

See also
Asensio Nebot
Penyagolosa

Municipalities in the Province of Castellón
Alt Maestrat